Aerial Manx. is an Amsterdam-based Australian sideshow entertainer who has pioneered the field of acrobatic sword swallowing. Aerial Manx was born on 18 March 1986 in Melbourne, Australia.

Early life
Aerial Manx was born in 1986 in Melbourne, Australia. He began training in Martial Arts at age four, branding him with a unique understanding of physicality and mental focus. At age 15, Aerial was introduced to circus through the Circus Oz youth program. By age 17, Aerial had achieved a first Dan black belt in Jiu-Jitsu and was regularly traveling to Melbourne from South-East Victoria to attend Australia's first self-run Youth Circus, Trick Circus.

Career
Aerial enrolled at the National Institute of Circus Arts (NICA) at age 19, and completed his training at the school with his graduating performance during the 2007 NICA production of DiVino. While studying at NICA, Aerial focused on sideshow and mind-over-matter stunts as well as being trained Aerial Dance under Holly Rollins, an ex-Cirque Du Soleil performer. After leaving NICA in 2007, Aerial began his professional performing career performing fire eating in various nightclubs throughout Melbourne. During this initial stage, Aerial also began performing street theatre on the streets of Melbourne CBD. Aerial's busking show started out with basic skills, gradually building up to a duo show with The Great Gordo Gamsby, and has since built up to be a highly energetic solo circle busking show that showcases his skills in contortion, contact juggling, acrobatics and his signature stunts in the field of sword swallowing acrobats. Aerial has performed his busking show throughout the UK, Europe, South East Asia and the vast majority of Australia.
At the 2007/8 Woodford Folk Music Festival, Aerial performed his first "world first" stunt with a double neon-tube swallow, swallowing two separate 2,000v simultaneously. Earlier in his career, Aerial was a member of the Kaos Kreepshow as well as the Opposable Thumbs Sideshow, and now performs group shows predominantly with The League of Sideshow Superstars and Solid State Circus
Aerial continues to maintain excellent skill levels in Contact Juggling, Juggling, Acrobatics, Contortion, Fire Eating, Glass walking, Blockhead, Suspension/Suspension Dance and various other forms of prop manipulation.

Some highlights of Aerial's career have been performing at the Glastonbury Festival in 2014, winning the People's Choice Award at the 2014 Auckland International Busking Festival, performing his solo theatre shows "False Messiah" and "Not Dead Yet" at the Melbourne, Adelaide and Perth Fringe Festivals and performing at a private function for Usher and the cast of his 2011 OMG Tour in Melbourne.

Development of Sword Swallowing Acrobatics
In 2008 at age 22, Aerial performed the World's First 'Handstand Sword Swallow', absolutely redefining extreme sword swallowing and pioneering the field of 'Sword Swallowing Acrobatics'. In 2010, Aerial undertook four more stunts that were previously not attempted or recorded and his passion for developing this field grew stronger. In March 2011, Aerial spent a day in the gardens of Melbourne CBD performing numerous stunts and being filmed for an unfinished documentary titled Aerial Manx, King of Swords. These stunts included the now signature move of Aerial Manx, the Sword Swallow backflip. This stunt was filmed when Aerial was invited to be a part of the Anatomy Arts documentary series for Matchbox Pictures, which was shot by Carnival Cinema, in the episode titled "Stomach" that was aired on the ABC on 19 March 2013. In this episode, the sword swallow backflip was filmed in breathtaking super-slow motion at 1,000 frames per second.

Records

Sword Swallowers Association International Records
Aerial has 12 world records listed with the Sword Swallowers Association International which are:
 First person to swallow two neon tubes simultaneously - 2007/8 
 First person to perform a handstand whilst swallowing a sword - 3 August 2008
 Longest time swallowing a sword whilst performing a handstand (17 seconds) - 2010
 World First Aerial Walkover whilst swallowing a sword - 2010
 World First suicide drop on Chinese pole whilst swallowing a sword - August 2010
 World First Sword Swallow while Balancing Upside Down in a Hand-to-hand Handstand (Based by Hemlock Mejarne) - 2010
 Most cartwheels whilst swallowing a sword (9 cartwheels) - February 2011
 World First chainsaw/machete juggle whilst swallowing a sword - 29 March 2011
 World First backflip whilst swallowing a sword - 29 March 2011
 First person to swallow two neon tubes and a sword simultaneously - 3 May 2011
 Heaviest Weighted Sword Swallow (31kg) - 3 May 2011
 World First sword swallow flesh hook suspension performance (including pyrotechnics) - 29 May 2011

Guinness World Records
Aerial has three Guinness World Records. His first was awarded to him on Lo Show Dei Record in Milan, Italy on 3 July 2014 and the second and third were awarded to him at the Venetian Casino in Macau on 10 January 2015.
 Guinness World Record for Most Backflips While Sword Swallowing in One Minute - 3 July 2014
 Guinness World Record for the Heaviest Weight to be Dangled From a Swallowed Sword - 10 January 2015
 Guinness World Record for the Fastest Human Backbend Walk over 20 metres - 10 January 2015

Public life
In 2011, Aerial made headlines in Victorian newspapers for a confrontation between Melbourne City Council officers and himself for performing without a permit. The confrontation resulted in a $1,500 fine. In 2012, Aerial was asked to be the subject of the Anatomy Arts documentary series for Matchbox Pictures, which was shot by Carnival Cinema, in the episode titled "Stomach".

Personal life
Aerial Manx lives in Melbourne, Australia.

References

1986 births
Living people
Australian contemporary artists
Australian jujutsuka
Australian performance artists
Sword swallowers